Hospital de Pediatría S.A.M.I.C. "Prof. Dr. Juan P. Garrahan", commonly known as Hospital Garrahan, is a public hospital in Buenos Aires, Argentina, located in the neighborhood of Parque Patricios. Since it opened on 25 August 1987, it has become the leading public, free and high-complexity pediatric hospital in the country.

It is a highly specialized medical center, with over 3000 employees, state-of-the-art technology and progressive cares. It is jointly funded by the federal government of Argentina (80%) and by the Buenos Aires City Government (20%).

References

Hospitals in Buenos Aires
Children's hospitals in Argentina